The Trans-en-Provence case was an event in which an unidentified flying object is claimed to have left physical evidence, in the form of burnt residue on a field. The event took place on 8 January 1981, outside the town of Trans-en-Provence in the French department of Var. It was described in Popular Mechanics as "perhaps the most completely and carefully documented sighting of all time."

Renato Nicolaï account 
The case began on 8 January 1981, at 5 pm. Renato Nicolaï, a 55-year-old farmer, heard a strange whistling sound while performing agricultural work on his property.

According to the witness, "The device had the shape of two saucers, one inverted on top of the other. It must have measured about 1.5 metres in height. It was the color of lead. This device had a ridge all the way around its circumference. Under the machine I saw two kinds of pieces as it was lifting off. They could be reactors or feet. There were also two other circles which looked like trapdoors.

Nicolaï claimed the object took off almost immediately, rising above the treeline and departing to the northeast. It left burn marks on the ground where it had supposedly sat.

The local gendarmerie were notified of the event the following day by Nicolaï directly on the advice of his neighbor's wife, Mrs. Morin. The gendarmerie proceeded to interview Nicolaï, take photos of the scene, and collect soil and plant samples from the field. The case was later sent to GEIPAN—or GEPAN (Groupe d'Étude des Phénomènes Aérospatiaux Non-identifiés) as it was known at that time—for review.

Analysis of evidence 
Trace amounts of phosphate and zinc were found in the sample material, and analysis of resident alfalfa near the landing site showed chlorophyll levels between 30% and 50% lower than expected.

Impressions and explanations 
Nicolaï had initially believed the object to be an experimental military device. The close proximity of the site to the Canjuers military base makes such a theory generally plausible. However, GEPAN's investigation focused on conventional explanations, such as atmospheric or terrain causes of a terrestrial nature. Despite a joint investigation by GEPAN and the gendarmerie, which lasted for two years, no plausible explanation was found.

Critique 

Some French scientists insist that the GEPAN investigation was flawed, especially the study of the physical traces.

The police report said that the traces, which appeared on an active road, looked like some made by the tyre of a car. This explanation was dismissed by GEPAN because of the sole witness saying otherwise.  The physical traces shown on the picture are not  perfect circles, in fact there are two more-or-less semicircles crossing over each other.  Also, a circular shape does not coincide with the description of the UFO made by Nikolaï.  In an interview for French television, Nikolaï confirmed that there were vehicles passing by on the road at the time of the sighting.

See also

List of reported UFO sightings
UFO sightings in France

References

External links 
  Trans-en-Provence Case – UFO Evidence
 Trans-en-Provence Case – Centre National D'etude Spatiales
  Skeptical explanation of this case, by Éric Maillot

1981 in France
20th century in Provence-Alpes-Côte d'Azur
January 1981 events in Europe
UFO sightings
Var (department)